The Ministry of Planning (Parikalpanā mantraṇālaẏa) oversees the financial policies of the Bangladeshi Government, responsible for socioeconomic planning and statistics management.

It contains three divisions:
Planning Division
Statistics and Informatics Division
Implementation Monitoring & Evaluation Division

Directorates
1. Planning Division
 Bangladesh Institute of Development Studies
 Planning Commission
 National Academy for Planning and Development

2. Statistics and Informatics Division
 Bangladesh Bureau of Statistics

3. Implementation Monitoring and Evaluation Division
Central Procurement Technical Unit

References

 
Planning
Planning ministries